The Taung Wine Hill bent-toed gecko (Cyrtodactylus dattkyaikensis) is a species of gecko endemic to Myanmar.

References

 http://reptile-database.reptarium.cz/species?genus=Cyrtodactylus&species=taungwineensis

Reptiles of Myanmar
Cyrtodactylus
Reptiles described in 2020
Taxa named by Larry Lee Grismer
Taxa named by Perry L. Wood
Taxa named by Evan Quah
Taxa named by Marta S. Grismer
Taxa named by Myint Kyaw Thura
Taxa named by Jamie R. Oaks
Taxa named by Aung Lin